The Left was a Spanish electoral alliance formed to contest the 2009 European Parliament election in Spain made up from both national and regional left wing parties.

Composition

Electoral performance

European Parliament

References

Defunct political party alliances in Spain
United Left (Spain)